is a 1995 Japanese manga series written by George Iida and illustrated by Asami Tohjoh which was adapted into an anime series broadcast in Japan in 2000. It was a joint production of TV Asahi Corporation and Nagoya Broadcasting Network. The series was produced for nighttime broadcast slot.

Plot
Harry McQuinn is a school loser until he discovers he has psychic powers. However, whenever Harry uses his powers, someone in the area near him is killed.

Episodes
 "Jellyfish"
 "Omen"
 "Force"
 "Isolation"
 "Escape"
 "Contact"
 "Affinity"
 "Heat"
 "Recover"
 "Day Dream"
 "Assassin"
 "Vortex"
 "Inquisition"
 "Greed"
 "Trap"
 "Suspicion"
 "Decoy"
 "Experiment"
 "Chaos"
 "Cosmos"

Theme Songs
Opening: "Mysterious" by Janne da Arc
Ending: "Ai wo Shiru ni wa Hayasugita no ka" by LUCA

External links
 

1995 manga
2000 anime television series debuts
Fictional characters with precognition
Takeshobo manga
TV Asahi original programming